Sophie's World is a 1991 novel by Norwegian writer Jostein Gaarder. It follows Sophie Amundsen, a Norwegian teenager, who is introduced to the history of philosophy as she is asked "Who are you?" in a letter from an unknown philosopher. The nonfictional content of the book aligns with Bertrand Russell's The History of Western Philosophy.

Sophie's World became a best-seller in Norway and won the Deutscher Jugendliteraturpreis in 1994. The English translation was published in 1995, and the book was reported to be the best-selling book in the world that year.
By 2011, the novel had been translated into fifty-nine languages, with over forty million print copies sold. It is one of the most commercially successful Norwegian novels outside of Norway, and has been adapted into a film and a PC game.

Plot summary
Sophie Amundsen is a 14-year-old girl who lives in Lillesand, Norway.

The book begins with Sophie receiving two messages in her mailbox and a postcard addressed to Hilde Møller Knag. Afterwards, she receives a packet of papers, part of a course in philosophy.

Sophie, without the knowledge of her mother, becomes the student of an old philosopher, Alberto Knox. Alberto teaches her about the history of philosophy. She gets a substantive and understandable review from the pre-Socratics to Jean-Paul Sartre. In addition to this, Sophie and Alberto receive postcards addressed to a girl named Hilde from a man named Albert Knag. As time passes, Knag begins to hide birthday messages to Hilde in ever more impossible ways, including hiding one inside an unpeeled banana and making Alberto's dog, Hermes, speak.

Eventually, through the philosophy of George Berkeley, Sophie and Alberto figure out that their entire world is a literary construction by Albert Knag as a present for Hilde, his daughter, on her 15th birthday. Hilde begins to read the manuscript but begins to turn against her father after he continues to meddle with Sophie's life by sending fictional characters like Little Red Riding Hood and Ebenezer Scrooge to talk to her.

Alberto helps Sophie fight back against Knag's control by teaching her everything he knows about philosophy, through the Renaissance, Romanticism, and Existentialism, as well as Darwinism and the ideas of Karl Marx. These take the form of long pages of text, and, later, monologues from Alberto. Alberto manages to concoct a plan so that he and Sophie can finally escape Albert's imagination. The trick is performed on Midsummer's Eve, during a "philosophical garden party" that Sophie and her mother arranged to celebrate Sophie's fifteenth birthday. The party soon descends into chaos as Albert Knag lost his control over the world, causing the guests to react with indifference to extraordinary occurrences. Alberto informs everyone that their world is fictional but the guests react with rage, believing him to be instilling dangerous values in the children. When a Mercedes smashes into the garden, Alberto and Sophie use it as an opportunity to escape. Knag is so focused on writing about the car that he does not notice them escaping into the real world.

Having finished the book, Hilde decides to help Sophie and Alberto get revenge on her father. Alberto and Sophie cannot interact with anything in the real world and cannot be seen by anyone but other fictional characters. A woman from Grimms' Fairy Tales gives them food before they prepare to witness Knag's return to Lillesand, Hilde's home.

While at the airport, Knag receives notes from Hilde set up at shops and gateways, instructing him on items to buy. He becomes increasingly paranoid as he wonders how Hilde is pulling the trick off. When he arrives back home, Hilde has forgiven him now that he has learned what it is like to have his world interfered with. Alberto and Sophie listen as Knag tells Hilde about one last aspect of philosophy—the universe itself. He tells her about the Big Bang and how everything is made up of the same material, which exploded outward at the beginning of time. Hilde learns that when she looks at the stars she is actually seeing into the past. Sophie makes a last effort to communicate with her by hitting her and Knag with a wrench. Knag does not feel anything, but Hilde feels as though a gadfly stung her, and can hear Sophie's whispers. Sophie wishes to ride in the rowboat but Alberto reminds her that, as they are not real people, they cannot manipulate objects. In spite of this, Sophie manages to untie the rowboat and they ride out onto the lake, immortal and invisible to all but a few. Hilde, inspired and mesmerized by philosophy and reconnected with her father, goes out to get the boat back.

Table of Contents

 The Garden of Eden
 The Top Hat
 The Myths
 The Natural Philosophers
 Democritus
 Fate
 Socrates
 Athens
 Plato
 The Major's Cabin
 Aristotle
 Hellenism
 The Postcards
 Two Cultures
 The Middle Ages
 The Renaissance
 The Baroque
 Descartes
 Spinoza
 Locke
 Hume
 Berkeley
 Bjerkely
 The Enlightenment
 Kant
 Romanticism
 Hegel
 Kierkegaard
 Marx
 Darwin
 Freud
 Our Own Time
 The Garden Party
 Counterpoint
 The Big Bang

Analysis and criticism

Translations
The book has been translated into several languages, including Portuguese,  Persian, Bengali, English, Hindustani (Hindi and Urdu), French, German and Chinese. Below are mentioned the names and translators of the translations.
 
 Portuguese: João Azenha Jr, 
 English: Paulette Miller, Sophie's World
 Persian: Hassan Kamshad, 1997, Niloofar Publications 
 Russian: Tatyana Dobronitskaya, 2000 
 Hindustani: Satyapaal Goswami,  (Hindi); Shahid Hameed,  (Urdu)
 Turkish: 
 Bengali: G.H. Habib, 
 Chinese: Xiao Baosen,

Adaptations

Film

In 1999, Sophie's World was adapted into a Norwegian film by screenwriter Petter Skavlan. It was not widely released outside of Norway. Kjersti Holmen won an Amanda Award for her role in the movie.

Television
The 1999 film was also presented as an eight-part TV series in Australia and Iceland, again scripted by Petter Skavlan.

It was also adapted for television in 1995 by Paul Greengrass and shown on the BBC as part of The Late Show. This version starred Jessica Marshall-Gardiner as Sophie, Jim Carter as Alberto Knox, and Twiggy as Sophie's mother.

Board game
In 1999, it was made into a board game by Robert Hyde and Ken Howard, and published by Sophisticated Games Ltd. The game involves answering trivia on famous philosophers and requires players to talk for several minutes on philosophical topics such as animal rights.

Computer game

In 1998, it was adapted into a PC and Mac CD-ROM game by The MultiMedia Corporation. The game allows players to learn about philosophy as in the book, while adapting the metafiction elements for a virtual world.

Music
English space rock band Spiritualized named their 1997 studio album Ladies and Gentlemen We Are Floating in Space after a line in the novel.
Chinese math rock indie band Baby Formula's self-titled album has a track called "Sophie's World".

Censorship
In the Xiao Baosen-translated Chinese version (Simplified Chinese) published by Writers Publishing House, parts of the content related to Karl Marx were deleted according to the requirements of the Ministry of Culture of the People's Republic of China, such as the last 32 paragraphs in the Marx Chapter.

See also

 Simulated reality
 World as Myth
 Neoplatonism

References

External links
 Timeline of Sophie's World references at Histropedia

1991 novels
Metafictional novels
Novels by Jostein Gaarder
Philosophical novels
Philosophy education
Novels set in Norway
Fiction set in 1990
Works about the history of philosophy
Norwegian-language novels
Norwegian novels adapted into films
Cultural depictions of Baruch Spinoza
People from Lillesand
Epistolary novels
Censored books